Sinjido is an island located off the cost of South Jeolla Province, South Korea. It covers an area of 30.99 km2 and features several peaks: Sang-san (324 m), Nohak-bong (225 m), Beom-san (151 m), and Giseon-bong (141 m). A bridge connecting Wando County and Sinjido was completed in 2004.
The island is 13 km long.

References

See also 
 Islands of South Korea
 South Jeolla Province
 Korea Strait

Islands of South Jeolla Province
Wando County